Carsten Schmelzer (born 1964) is a German musician and music producer from Berlin.

Biography 
Schmelzer began to play the piano at the age of six. He took up the bass guitar at the age of 15. Carsten Schmelzer graduated from high school at the age of 18 and then turned to his career as a professional bass player.

Schmelzer took up Music Studies for a year in 1988 at the Musicians Institute, Bass Institute of Technology (BIT) in Los Angeles, graduating with Honors in 1989. He was active as a session musician and band member with Jennifer Rush, Romy Haag, the Petra Zieger Band, Rosenstolz, Klaus Renft Combo, Potsch Potschka (Spliff), Frank Diez (Peter Maffay), Jean-Jacques Kravetz (Lindenberg), der Joey Albrecht Band (Kartago), Pete Wyoming Bender, RAD, Village Voices, TrioRio and various other bands of different styles.

In 1990 Schmelzer won the Berliner Studio-Jazz Competition with the band The Visit. Since 1994, he has been working as a producer and composer, producing CDs, jingles, and music for commercials. In 2006 he composed the music for the Emmy Award-Winner Series I Got A Rocket (2008). In 2008, Schmelzer founded the production company 3Berlin together with Tobias Weyrauch and Diane Weigmann.

Discography

Instruments and performance 

 1992:  Klaus Gertken Trio – Someone Blind
 1994:  Klaus Gertken Trio – Insen
 1994:  Klaus Gertken Trio – Melo
 1996:  Materia (2) – No Day To Talk
 1996:  uTe kA Band* – Cosmopolitan
 1998:  Rosenstolz – Alles Gute
 2000:  Various – Ostrock In Klassik Volume II
 2013:  3Berlin – Die Schönsten & Besten Partylieder Für Kinder
 2014:  3Berlin – Summ, Summ, Summ (Die Beliebtesten Schlaflieder)

Writing & arrangement 

 1994:  Klaus Gertken Trio – Insen (Meditation)
 2016:  Various – Neue Deutsche Kindermusik (Tanzlied)
 2018:  3Berlin – Nicht Von Schlechten Eltern 2 (Der Allerbeste Urlaub)
 2019:  Various – KIKA Party-Hits (Ich Hab's (Erfinderlied)

Awards

I Got A Rocket 

 Emmy Award 2008 (Children Daytime Approaches))
 AFI Award 2007 (Best Children ́s Television Drama)
 L ́Oreal Paris Nomination 2007

Schmock (Short Film) 

 Murnau Kurzfilm Award 2005

Muxmäuschenstill 

 Max Ophüls Preis 2004
 Deutscher Filmpreis 2004 (Best feature film nomination)

References

External links 
 Official Website
 
 Linkedin Profile
 Xing Profile
 3Berlin Facebook Page

1964 births
German record producers
Musicians from Berlin
German male musicians
Living people